The 2021 TCR Europe Touring Car Series was the sixth season of TCR Europe Touring Car Series. The season began at the Slovakiaring in May and ended at the Circuit de Barcelona-Catalunya in October.

Mikel Azcona won the drivers' championship for the second time and Sébastien Loeb Racing won the teams' championship for the first time.

Calendar 
The calendar was announced on 23 December 2020 with 7 rounds scheduled.

Calendar Changes 

 The Circuito del Jarama and Circuit of Zolder rounds were dropped out of the calendar
 Nurburgring and Slovakiaring were included in the calendar.

Teams and drivers 
Hankook is the official tire supplier.

Summary 
 SMC Junior Motorsport will enter a Peugeot 308 TCR for Fernando Navarrete, who will be competing in a partial campaign during the season
 Brutal Fish Racing will enter three Honda Civic Type R TCR, as last year. Martin Ryba, Isidro Callejas and Jack Young are confirmed. Dan Lloyd left the series to return the British Touring Car Championship and join Power Maxed Racing, but will remain within the team as a driver coach.
 Tom Coronel will move from Boutsen Ginion Racing to Comtoyou Racing to replace Mehdi Bennani and he will be joined by 2020 TCR Eastern Europe winner Dušan Borković who returns to the series after having last raced in 2019 for Autodis Racing by Target Competition to replace Sami Taoufik.
 After running a partial campaign during the 2020 season, Volcano Motorsport will enter the series full-time, but will enter two all new Cupra León Competición TCR cars for Evgeni Leonov and Mikel Azcona.
 Sébastien Loeb Racing will enter four Hyundai Elantra N TCR cars during the season. Niels Langeveld, Felice Jelmini and Sami Taoufik have been confirmed to be three of the team's entries, Mehdi Bennani returns to the team.
 Team Clairet Sport will enter two Peugeot 308 TCR and two Cupra Leon TCR. Teddy Clairet, Jimmy Clairet and Gilles Colombani were remained at the team but Gilles Colombani will switch from Peugeot 308 TCR to Cupra León TCR and Sylvain Pussier returned to the series and Team Clairet Sport to replace Stéphane Ventaja.
 Dániel Nagy will move from Hyundai i30 N TCR to Cupra León Competición TCR and return to Zengő Motorsport.

Results and standings

Season summary

Drivers' standings 
Scoring system

† – Drivers did not finish the race, but were classified as they completed over 75% of the race distance.

Teams' standings

TCR BeNeLux Drivers' standings (top 3)

References

External links
 

2021 in European sport
Europe Touring Car Series